Ukraine competed at the 2022 World Games in Birmingham, United States, from 7 July to 17 July 2022. Ukraine ranked third in the medal tally (behind Germany and the United States) as well as third by the number of medals (behind Italy and Germany). This was the best performance of Ukrainian athletes at the World Games.

Part of the ticket revenue was announced to be donated to Ukraine for rebuilding sports venues after the Russian invasion of Ukraine. A sum of $54,000 was donated to Ukraine.

Medallists

Larysa Soloviova won at the age of 43 her fifth World Games medal. Before that, Soloviova won the competitions in middleweight at the 2005 Games (under her maiden surname Vitsiyevska), 2013 Games and 2017 Games as well as the competition in heavyweight at the 2009 Games. As of 2022, she is the most successful female powerlifter in the history of the World Games.

Bohdan Mochulskyi repeated his success of the 2017 Games and won gold in men's ju-jitsu. Both Igor Liubchenko and Oleh Pryimachov repeated their success of the 2017 Games when they won gold in men's muaythai. Svitlana Yaromka and Ivanna Berezovska won medals in both their weight category and open weight. Previously, Yaromka won a bronze at the 2013 Games and Berezovska won a silver at the 2017 Games.

Danylo Filchenko became the first Ukrainian athlete to win a medal in water skiing. Sofiia Hrechko became the first Ukrainian female finswimmer to win the World Games gold medal. Anzhelika Terliuga became the first Ukrainian female karateka to win the World Games gold medal. Bohdan Kolmakov won gold medal in parkour which debuted at the World Games. Alina Krysko became first Ukrainian female to win a medal in wushu at the World Games. Bogdana Golub became first Ukrainian female to win a medal in ju-jitsu at the World Games.

Anastasiia Antoniak won a medal at each of three consecutive World Games. Both Stanislav Horuna and Anita Serogina won their second World Games medal after they won their first medals in 2017. Volodymyr Rysyiev won his second World Games medals after he had been second in middleweight at the 2017 Games. Tetyana Melnyk won her second World Games medals after she had been second at the 2017 Games. Both Orfan Sananzade and Vitalii Dubina won their second World Games medal after they won their first medals in 2017 when kickboxing was an invitational sport.

Main programme

Invitational sports

Competitors

Acrobatic gymnastics

Ukraine competed in acrobatic gymnastics and had the largest team at the Games. Ukraine won four of five medals and became the most successful in terms of number of medals.

Aerobic gymnastics

Ukraine was the fifth largest team in the sport (behind Italy, Romania, Hungary and Azerbaijan) and did not compete in the dance competition. Maksym Buben was a reserve athlete.

Air sports

Ukraine competed in air sports.

Canoe marathon

Ukraine was represented in all events.

Men

Women

Dancesport

Ukraine competed in dancesport.

Standard

Finswimming

Ukraine competed in almost all events in finswimming (except for women's 50 m apnoe).

Men

Women

Ju-jitsu

Ukraine competed in ju-jitsu.

Men

Women

Karate

Ukraine managed to qualify 2 male and 4 female karateka, all in kumite competitions. Ukraine's team was the third largest team (after the host United States and Egypt). Kateryna Kryva and Anita Serogina qualified as medallist of the 2021 World Championships. Stanislav Horuna and Anzhelika Terliuga qualified through the WKF rating. Halyna Melnyk qualified as a continental representative. Ryzvan Talibov qualified as replacement athlete. Ukraine finished third in the medal tally in karate behind Spain and Egypt.

Men

Women

Kickboxing

Ukraine's kickboxing team was the biggest at the Games. Ukraine was not represented only in women's 70 kg category.

Men

Women

Muaythai

Ukraine and Thailand qualified the largest number of boxers after the host United States that were allowed to enter a competitor in each category. Ukraine became the most successful nation in the sport at the Games.

Men

Women

Orienteering

Ukraine competed in orienteering.

Men

Women

Mixed

Parkour

This was parkour's debut at the World Games. Only Ukraine and Japan were scheduled to compete in all men's and women's competitions but Bohdan Kolmakov did not start in the freestyle event. Czech Republic and Sweden were also represented by a male and a female athlete but not in all events.

Men

Women

Powerlifting

Ukraine competed in powerlifting and was the biggest team in the sport, though the country was not represented in all categories. Ukraine became the most successful nation in the sport by winning 7 medals, including 2 gold medals.

Men

Women

Rhythmic gymnastics

Ukraine was represented in all events by the maximum number of athletes.

Sport climbing

Ukraine won one bronze medal in sport climbing.

Speed

Lead

Squash

Ukraine competed in squash.

Sumo

Ukraine's sumo team was the third largest sumo team at the Games (after the host United States and Japan). Both Ukraine and Japan won 9 medals and became the most successful teams in terms of medals won, but Japan won 4 gold medals, while Ukraine won 3 gold medals. Ivanna Berezovska and Svitlana Yaromka managed to win medals both in their category and in open weight.

Weight categories
Men

Women

Openweight
Main rounds

Repechages

Trampoline gymnastics

Ukraine competed in trampoline gymnastics.

Men

Women

Water skiing

Ukraine competed in water skiing. Ukraine did not compete in slalom competitions as well as women's tricks and men's wakeboard. Danylo Filchenko was the only athlete in this sport to win two medals. Ukraine was the most successful European team in this sport at the Games.

Tricks

Wakeboard

Jump

Wushu

Ukraine competed in wushu.

Changquan

Daoshu / Gunshu

Jianshu / Qiangshu

References

External links 
 Countries at the 2022 World Games

Nations at the 2022 World Games
World Games
2022